Élio Bruno Teixeira Martins (born 26 March 1985) is a Portuguese professional footballer who plays for A.D. Machico as a winger or forward.

Club career
Martins was born in Machico, Madeira. After years of playing in the lower leagues, especially with hometown club A.D. Machico, he reached the professionals in 2009–10, scoring six goals in 27 games as S.C. Beira-Mar promoted to the Primeira Liga as champions. After spending the first part of the 2010–11 campaign on loan to Cypriot team Doxa Katokopias FC he returned for a further two seasons in the top division, being all but played as a substitute.

On 27 June 2012, Martins signed with PFC Beroe Stara Zagora in Bulgaria, on a three-year contract. In his first season he netted seven times in the Bulgarian Cup, including a brace in the final against PFC Levski Sofia: the match finished in a 3–3 draw, but Beroe won 3–1 on penalties.

Martins returned to his country in the summer of 2014, netting a career-best 14 goals in his first season at C.F. União to help them return to top flight after two decades. On 24 April 2017, the 32-year old left Lebanon's Akhaa Ahli Aley FC and joined PS TIRA from the Liga 1 (Indonesia) on a one-year deal.

Honours

Club
Beira-Mar
Segunda Liga: 2009–10

Beroe
Bulgarian Cup: 2012–13
Bulgarian Supercup: 2013

References

External links

1985 births
Living people
People from Machico, Madeira
Portuguese footballers
Madeiran footballers
Association football wingers
Association football forwards
Primeira Liga players
Liga Portugal 2 players
Segunda Divisão players
G.D. Chaves players
S.C. Beira-Mar players
C.F. União players
Cypriot First Division players
Doxa Katokopias FC players
First Professional Football League (Bulgaria) players
PFC Beroe Stara Zagora players
Lebanese Premier League players
Akhaa Ahli Aley FC players
Liga 1 (Indonesia) players
PS TIRA players
Bhayangkara F.C. players
Portuguese expatriate footballers
Expatriate footballers in Cyprus
Expatriate footballers in Bulgaria
Expatriate footballers in Lebanon
Expatriate footballers in Indonesia
Portuguese expatriate sportspeople in Cyprus
Portuguese expatriate sportspeople in Bulgaria
Portuguese expatriate sportspeople in Indonesia